Achiras is a locality located in the Río Cuarto Department in the Province of Córdoba in central Argentina.

References

Populated places in Córdoba Province, Argentina